Khuzistania is a monotypic snout moth genus described by Hans Georg Amsel in 1959. Its single species, Khuzistania richteri, described by the same author, is found in Iran.

References

Phycitinae
Monotypic moth genera
Moths of Asia
Taxa named by Hans Georg Amsel
Pyralidae genera